La Calesita is a 1963 Argentine drama film directed by Hugo del Carril.

Cast
 Hugo del Carril as Raimundo 'Goyo' Lucero
 Fanny Navarro as Azucena
 María Aurelia Bisutti
 Mario Lozano as The Raimundo's Godfather

External links
 

1963 films
1960s Spanish-language films
Argentine black-and-white films
Films directed by Hugo del Carril
1960s Argentine films